The term tarpan (Equus ferus ferus) refers to free-ranging horses of the Eurasian steppe from the 18th to the 20th century. It is generally unknown whether those horses represented genuine wild horses, feral domestic horses or hybrids. The last individual believed to be a tarpan died in captivity in the Russian Empire during 1909.

Beginning in the 1930s, several attempts were made to develop horses that looked like tarpans through selective breeding, called "breeding back" by advocates. Some of these horses are now commercially promoted as "tarpans", although such animals are only domestic breeds and not the wild animal themselves.

Name and etymology
The name "tarpan" or "tarpani" derives from a Turkic language (Kazakh or Kyrgyz) name meaning "wild horse". The Tatars and the Cossacks distinguished the wild horse from the feral horse; the latter was called Takja or Muzin.

Taxonomy
The tarpan was first described by Samuel Gottlieb Gmelin in 1771; he had seen the animals in 1769 in the district of Bobrov, near Voronezh. In 1784, Pieter Boddaert named the species Equus ferus, referring to Gmelin's description. Unaware of Boddaert's name, Otto Antonius published the name Equus gmelini in 1912, again referring to Gmelin's description. Since Antonius' name refers to the same description as Boddaert's it is a junior objective synonym.  It is now thought that the domesticated horse, named Equus caballus by Carl Linnaeus in 1758, is descended from the tarpan; indeed, many taxonomists consider them to belong to the same species. By a strict application of the rules of the International Code of Zoological Nomenclature, the tarpan ought to be named E. caballus, or if considered a subspecies, E. caballus ferus. However, biologists have generally ignored the letter of the rule and used E. ferus for the tarpan to avoid confusion with the domesticated subspecies.

It is debated if the small, free-roaming horses seen in the Russian steppes during 18th and 19th centuries and called "tarpan" were indeed wild, never-domesticated horses, hybrids of the Przewalski's horse and local domestic animals, or simply feral horses. Most studies have been based on only two preserved specimens and research to date has not positively linked the tarpan to Pleistocene or Holocene-era animals.

In 2003, the International Commission on Zoological Nomenclature "conserved the usage of 17 specific names based on wild species, which are predated by or contemporary with those based on domestic forms", confirming E. ferus for the undomesticated wild horse. Taxonomists who consider the domestic horse a subspecies of the wild horse should use Equus ferus caballus; the name Equus caballus remains available for the domestic horse where it is considered to be a separate species.

Appearance 
 
Traditionally, two tarpan subtypes have been proposed, the forest tarpan and steppe tarpan, although there seem to be only minor differences in type. The general view is that there was only one subspecies, the tarpan, Equus ferus ferus.

A number of coat color genotypes have been identified within European wild horses from the Pleistocene and Holocene: those creating bay, black and leopard complex are known from the wild horse population in Europe and were depicted in cave paintings of wild horses  during the Pleistocene. The dun gene, a dilution gene seen in Przewalski's horse that also creates the grullo or "blue dun" coat seen in the Konik, has not yet been studied in European wild horses. It is likely that at least some wild horses had a dun coat.

Whether or not the horses called tarpan had a standing mane like wild equines, or a falling mane like domestic horses cannot be ascertained anymore as historic reports have not been unambiguous on this subject. 

The appearance of European wild horses may be reconstructed with genetic, osteologic and historic data. One genetic study suggests that bay was the predominant color in European wild horses. During the Mesolithic, a gene coding a black coat color appeared on the Iberian peninsula. This color spread east but was less common than bay in the investigated sample and never reached Siberia.  Bay in combination with dun results in the "bay dun" color seen in Przewalski's horses; black with dun creates the grullo coat. A loss of the dun dilution may have been advantageous in more forested western European landscapes, as dark colors were a better camouflage in forests. Pangaré or "mealy" coloration, a characteristic of other wild equines, might have been present in at least some European wild horses, as historic accounts report a light belly. 

Historic references describing the tarpan report that most of them were of a black dun (grullo, "blue dun") colour, while also black individuals and domestic colours like white legs or greys were reported. Because of that, some contemporaneous authors, such as Peter Pallas, believed tarpans to be escaped farm horses.

History

Wild horses have been present in Europe since the Pleistocene and ranged from southern France and Spain east to central Russia. There are cave drawings of primitive predomestication horses at Lascaux, France and in Cave of Altamira, Spain, as well as artifacts believed to show the species in southern Russia, where a horse of this type was domesticated around 3000 BC.  Equus ferus had a continuous range from western Europe to Alaska; historic material suggests wild horses lived in most parts of Holocene continental Europe and the Eurasian steppe, except for parts of Scandinavia, Iceland and Ireland.

Ancient equine DNA
Tarpan DNA shows its ancestry to be a mixture between horses native to Europe and found with the Corded Ware Culture, and horses closely related to the DOM2 population, the ancestors of modern domestic horses. (DOM2 horses originated from the Western Eurasia steppes, especially the lower Volga-Don, but not in Anatolia, during the late fourth and early third millennia BCE. Their genes may show selection for easier domestication and stronger backs). This is not consistent with tarpans as the wild ancestor of, or a feral version of, DOM2. Nor is the tarpan a hybrid with Przewalski’s horses.

Forest tarpan
The "forest horse" or "forest tarpan" was a hypothesis of various 20th-century natural scientists, including Tadeusz Vetulani, who suggested that the continuous forestation of Europe after the last ice age created forest-adapted subtype of the wild horse, which he named Equus sylvestris.  However, historic references do not describe any major difference between the populations, and therefore most authors assume there was only one subspecies of western Eurasian wild horse, Equus ferus ferus.  

Nevertheless, a stocky type of  horse living in forests and highlands was described during the 19th century in Spain, the Pyrenees, the Camargue, the Ardennes, Great Britain, and the southern Swedish upland.
They had a robust head and strong body, and a long frizzy mane. The color was described as faint brown or yellowish brown with eel stripe and leg stripes, or wholly black legs. The flanks and shoulders were spotted, some of them tended to an ashy colour. They dwelled in rocky habitats and showed intelligent and fierce behaviour. Yet, those horses were never colloquially called "tarpans".

Black wild horses were found in Dutch swamps, with a large skull, small eyes, and a bristly muzzle. Their mane was full, with broad hooves, and curly hair. However, it is possible that these were feral and not wild horses.

Herodotus described light-coloured wild horses in an area now part of Ukraine in the 5th century BCE. In the 12th century, Albertus Magnus stated that mouse-coloured wild horses with a dark eel stripe lived in the German territory, and in Denmark, large herds were hunted.

16th century free-ranging horses in Europe

Wild horses still were common in the east of Prussia during the 15th and early 16th centuries. During the 16th century, wild horses disappeared from most of the mainland of western Europe and became less common in eastern Europe as well. Belsazar Hacquet saw wild horses in the Polish zoo in Zamość during the Seven Years' War. According to him, those wild horses were of small body size, had a blackish brown colour, a large and thick head, short dark manes and tail hair, and a "beard". They were absolutely untameable and defended themselves harshly against predators.

Kajetan Kozmian visited the population at Zamość as well and reported that they were small and strong, had robust limbs and a consistently dark mouse colour. Samuel Gottlieb Gmelin witnessed herds in Voronezh in 1768. Those horses were described as very fast and shy, fleeing at any noise, and as small, with small, pinned ears and a short frizzly mane. The tail was shorter than in domestic horses. They were typically mouse-colored with a light belly and legs becoming black, although gray and white horses were mentioned as well. The coat was long and dense. The horses at Zamosc were never called "tarpan" back in their lifetime.

Peter Simon Pallas witnessed possible tarpans in the same year in southern Russia. He thought they were feral animals that escaped during the confusions of wars. These herds were important game of the Tatars and numbered between 5 and 20 animals. The horses he described had a small body, large and thick heads, short frizzly manes and short tail hair, as well as pinned ears. The colour was described as faint brownish, sometimes brown or black. He also reported of obvious domestic hybrids with light-colored legs or gray coats.

The tarpans of 18th century Europe
The Natural History of Horses by 19th-century author Charles Hamilton Smith also described tarpans. According to Smith, the herds of free-ranging horses numbered from a few to hundred individuals. They often were mixed with domestic horses, and alongside pure herds there were herds of feral horses or hybrids. The color of alleged pure tarpans was described as consistently brown, cream-colored or mouse-colored. The short frizzy mane was reported to be black, as were the tail and legs. The ears were of varying size, but set high on the skull. The eyes were small.

According to Smith, tarpans made stronger sounds than domestic horses and the overall appearance of these horses was mule-like.

Extinction
 
The human-caused extinction of wild horses in Europe began in Southern Europe, possibly in antiquity.  While humans had been hunting wild horses since the Paleolithic, during historic times horse meat was an important source of protein for many cultures. As large herbivores, the range of the tarpan was continuously decreased by the increasing human population of the Eurasian landmass. Wild horses were further targeted because they caused damage to hay stores and often took domestic mares from pastures. Furthermore, interbreeding with wild horses was an economic loss for farmers since the foals of such matings were intractable. 

Tarpans lived in the southern parts of the Russian steppe. In 1879 the last scientifically confirmed individual was killed. After that, only dubious sightings were documented. As the tarpan horse died out in the wild between 1875 and 1890, the last free-ranging mare considered a tarpan was accidentally killed during an attempt at capture. The last captive tarpan died in 1909 in a Russian zoo.

The horses at Zamosc survived until 1806, when they were allegedly donated to local farmers of Poland and bred to their horses. The Konik is claimed to descend from these hybrid horses, as recent research has highlighted a significant degree of anatomic difference between free-roaming Konik in the Netherlands and other modern domesticated horses.

Tarpans interbreeding with domestic horses 

The oldest archaeological evidence for domesticated horses is from Kazakhstan and Ukraine between 6,000 and 5,500 YBP (years before present). The diverse mitochondrial DNA of domestic horses contrasts sharply with the very low diversity of the Y chromosome; that suggests that many mares but only a few stallions were used, and local use of wild mares or even secondary sites of domestication are likely. Therefore, the European wild horse may well have contributed to the domestic horse.

Wild horses vs. feral horses
Some researchers consider the tarpans to be mixed wild and feral population or completely feral horses. Few consider the more recent animals historically called "tarpans" to be genuine wild horses without domestic influence. Historic references to "wild horses" may actually refer to feral domestic horses or hybrids.

Some 19th century authors wrote that local "wild" horses had hoof problems that led to crippled legs; therefore, they assumed these were feral horses. Other contemporary authors claimed all "wild" horses between the Volga River and the Ural were actually feral. However, others thought that this was too speculative and assumed that wild, undomesticated horses still lived into the 19th century. Domestic horses used in warfare often were turned loose when they were no longer needed. Also, remaining wild stallions could steal domestic mares. There are some accounts from the 18th and 19th centuries of wild herds with typical wild horse features such as large heads, pinned ears, short frizzy mane and tail, but mentioned animals with domestic influence as well.
	
The only known individual to be photographed was the so-called Cherson tarpan, which was caught as a foal near Novovorontsovka in 1866. It died in 1887 in the Moscow Zoo. The nature of this horse was dubious in its lifetime, because it showed almost none of the wild horse features described in the historic sources. In 2021, a study found that the so-called 'Shatilov' tarpan, a museum specimen from the Kherson region of the Pontic–Caspian steppe that died in 1868, was a hybrid between two horse lineages, with two thirds of its genetics representing the same ancestral lineage as modern horses, and the remaining third related to a distinct lineage of European horses found at an archaeological site associated with the late-Neolithic Corded Ware culture.

Breeding back the tarpan
Three attempts have been made to use selective breeding to create a type of horse that resembles the tarpan phenotype, though recreating an extinct subspecies is not genetically possible with current technology. In 1936, Polish university professor Tadeusz Vetulani selected Polish farm horses that were formerly known as Panje horses (now called Konik) and that he believed resembled the historic tarpan and started a selective breeding program. Although his breeding attempt is well known, it made only a minor contribution to the modern Konik stock, which clusters genetically with other domestic horse breeds, including those as diverse as the Mongolian horse and the Thoroughbred.

In the early 1930s, Berlin Zoo Director Lutz Heck and Heinz Heck of the Munich Zoo began a program crossbreeding Koniks with Przewalski horses, Gotland ponies, and Icelandic horses. By the 1960s they produced the Heck horse. In the mid-1960s, Harry Hegard started a similar program in the United States using mustangs and local working ranch horses that has resulted in the Hegardt or Stroebel's horse.

Assessment
While all three breeds have a primitive look that resembles the tarpan in some respects, they are not genetically tarpans and the wild, predomestic European horse remains extinct. However, this does not prevent some modern breeders from marketing horses with these features as a "tarpan".

In spite of sharing primitive external features, the Konik and Hucul horses have markedly different conformation with differently proportioned body measurements, thought in part to be linked to living in different habitats.

Other breeds sometimes alleged to be surviving wild horses include the Exmoor pony and the Dülmen pony. However, genetic studies do not set any of these breeds apart from other domestic horses. On the other hand, there has not yet been a study comparing domestic breeds directly with the European wild horse.

See also
Domestication of the horse
List of extinct animals of Europe
Przewalski's horse

References

External links

The Spanish Tarpan
The Spanish Tarpan in North America
American "Tarpan"
North American Tarpan Association

Controversial mammal taxa
Equus (genus)
Extinct mammals of Europe
Species made extinct by human activities
Mammal extinctions since 1500
Pleistocene horses
Horse subspecies
Mammals described in 1785